Indian Hills is a neighborhood in southwestern Lexington, Kentucky, United States. It is bounded by New Circle Road and Harrodsburg Road. Its southern boundary varies depending on the development rates of it and the neighboring Stonewall neighborhood. Indian Hills is the latest to be built.

Indian Hills is alternatively called Pera Place II. Pera Place It was developed at the same time and is located on the other side of New Circle Road.

Neighborhood statistics
 Area: 
 Population: 364
 Population density: 2,277 people per square mile
 Median household income: $71,587

References

External links
 http://www.city-data.com/neighborhood/Indian-Hills-Lexington-KY.html

Neighborhoods in Lexington, Kentucky